Jesse Lee Forbes (born October 24, 1984) is a retired American mixed martial artist. A professional competitor from 2005 until 2010, he competed for the UFC, WEC, the MFC, and was a competitor on The Ultimate Fighter 3.

Background
Forbes was born in Portland, Maine, and moved to Arizona. He was a two-time All-State wrestler at Corona del Sol High School in Tempe, Arizona, before going on to wrestle at Pima Community College, where he was a NJCAA All-American. Former UFC fighter Drew Fickett is also an alumnus of PCC, and Forbes trained with him soon after college.

Mixed martial arts career

The Ultimate Fighter
Forbes signed with the UFC to appear on The Ultimate Fighter 3.

Forbes was the first pick on Team Ken Shamrock and second overall. Shamrock explained that when Tito Ortiz chose Matt Hamill as his first pick that he would have to pick someone he thought could beat Hamill, and he thought Forbes was that person. While on the show, Forbes was the youngest in the house. Despite Shamrock's belief that Forbes was a force to be reckoned with, he lost his preliminary fight against Noah Inhofer via submission. He was brought back on the show after Inhofer asked to be sent home (therefore disqualifying him from the competition) for fear that his girlfriend believed he had cheated on her. Forbes returned with a mohawk and a second chance that put him in Inhofer's semi-finals spot.

Forbes lost again in his just received semi-final spot to Josh Haynes via guillotine choke despite dominating the first round that even Ortiz admitted could have been scored 10-8.

Forbes was pitted against Team Ortiz's Matt Hamill at the finale of the show. Forbes lost again that night via TKO in the first round.

Post-TUF
Forbes compiled an 11-2 record after being released from the UFC, including notable wins over fellow UFC veterans Jesse Taylor and James Head.

Return to UFC
Forbes made his UFC return on January 11, 2010 at UFC Fight Night 20 against Nick Catone, replacing an injured Steve Steinbeiss. Forbes lost the fight via controversial split decision.

Forbes faced Ryan Jensen at UFC 114 on May 29, 2010. He lost the fight via guillotine choke submission in the first round dropping his UFC record to 0-3. After his second straight loss, he was released from the UFC once again.

Post-UFC career
In his first fight since leaving the UFC, Forbes fought Strikeforce veteran Anthony Smith at Crowbar MMA: Fall Brawl on September 11, 2010. He won via second round TKO.

Forbes then faced Justin Guthrie at Crowbar MMA: Winter Brawl on December 10, 2010. He won via triangle choke submission.

Personal life
Forbes is currently a firefighter/paramedic with the Phoenix Fire Department.

Mixed martial arts record

|-
| Win
| align=center| 15–5
| Justin Guthrie
| Submission (triangle choke)
| Crowbar MMA: Winter Brawl
| 
| align=center| 2
| align=center| 1:57
| Fargo, North Dakota, United States
| 
|-
| Win
| align=center| 14–5
| Anthony Smith
| TKO (punches)
| Crowbar MMA: Fall Brawl
| 
| align=center| 2
| align=center| 1:28
| Fargo, North Dakota, United States
| 
|-
| Loss
| align=center| 13–5
| Ryan Jensen
| Submission (guillotine choke)
| UFC 114
| 
| align=center| 1
| align=center| 1:06
| Las Vegas, Nevada, United States
| 
|-
| Loss
| align=center| 13–4
| Nick Catone
| Decision (split)
| UFC Fight Night: Maynard vs. Diaz
| 
| align=center| 3
| align=center| 5:00
| Fairfax, Virginia, United States
| 
|-
| Win
| align=center| 13–3
| James Head
| Decision (unanimous)
| Pro Battle MMA
| 
| align=center| 3
| align=center| 5:00
| Springdale, Arkansas, United States
| 
|-
| Win
| align=center| 12–3
| Cleburn Walker
| Submission (rear-naked choke)
| 5150 Combat: Rumble at the Rally
| 
| align=center| 1
| align=center| 3:02
| Sparks, Oklahoma, United States
| 
|-
| Win
| align=center| 11–3
| Dave Vitkay
| TKO (punches)
| Wild Bill's Fight Night 19
| 
| align=center| 1
| align=center| 2:05
| Duluth, Georgia, United States
| 
|-
| Win
| align=center| 10–3
| Shane Dezee
| TKO (punches)
| Extreme Beatdown
| 
| align=center| 1
| align=center| 1:34
| San Carlos, Arizona, United States
| 
|-
| Win
| align=center| 9–3
| JR Schumacher
| TKO (punches)
| MTXAFN 2: Evolution
| 
| align=center| 1
| align=center| 3:13
| Las Vegas, Nevada, United States
| 
|-
| Loss
| align=center| 8–3
| Ryan Jimmo
| Decision (unanimous)
| XMMA 6: House of Pain
| 
| align=center| 3
| align=center| 5:00
| Montreal, Canada
| 
|-
| Win
| align=center| 8–2
| Bernard Rutherford
| TKO (punches)
| Wild Bill's Fight Night 15 
| 
| align=center| 1
| align=center| 2:37
| Duluth, Georgia, United States
| 
|-
| Win
| align=center| 7–2
| Chris Camozzi
| Submission (armbar)
| MFC 15: Rags to Riches
| 
| align=center| 3
| align=center| 1:45
| Edmonton, Canada
| 
|-
| Win
| align=center| 6–2
| Victor Moreno
| TKO (punches) 
| MTXAFN: Let's Get it On 
| 
| align=center| 1
| align=center| 1:38
| Las Vegas, Nevada, United States
| 
|-
| Loss
| align=center| 5–2
| Bryan Baker
| TKO (punches) 
| WEC 30
| 
| align=center| 1
| align=center| 4:15
| Las Vegas, Nevada, United States
|
|-
| Win
| align=center| 5–1
| Jesse Taylor
| Submission (armbar)
| Tuff-N-Uff 2
| 
| align=center| 1
| align=center| 1:21
| Las Vegas, Nevada, United States
|Middleweight debut.
|-
| Win
| align=center| 4–1
| Tim Peacock
| Submission (triangle choke)
| WFC: Desert Storm
| 
| align=center| 1
| align=center| 0:50
| Camp Verde, Arizona, United States
| 
|-
| Win
| align=center| 3–1
| Michael Gonzalez
| Submission (rear-naked choke)
| CFF: Cage Fighting Federation
| 
| align=center| 1
| align=center| N/A
| Albuquerque, New Mexico, United States
| 
|-
| Loss
| align=center| 2–1
| Matt Hamill
| TKO (strikes)
| The Ultimate Fighter: Team Ortiz vs. Team Shamrock Finale
| 
| align=center| 1
| align=center| 4:47
| Las Vegas, Nevada, United States
| 
|-
| Win
| align=center| 2–0
| Scott Svobada
| Submission (rear-naked choke)
| USA MMA: Pacific Northwest Invitational 1
| 
| align=center| 1
| align=center| N/A
| Tacoma, Washington, United States
| 
|-
| Win
| align=center| 1–0
| Arturo Segovia
| Submission (armbar)
| RITC 72: Welcome to the Fort
| 
| align=center| 2
| align=center| 2:14
| Glendale, Arizona, United States
|

References

External links
 
 

American male sport wrestlers
American male mixed martial artists
Middleweight mixed martial artists
Mixed martial artists utilizing collegiate wrestling
Mixed martial artists utilizing Brazilian jiu-jitsu
Living people
Sportspeople from Portland, Maine
1984 births
Mixed martial artists from Maine
American practitioners of Brazilian jiu-jitsu
Ultimate Fighting Championship male fighters